Trevor Junior Benjamin (born 8 February 1979) is a former professional footballer and manager who played as a forward.

He is famed for being a prime example of a journeyman footballer, having represented 29 teams in his career, and making over 350 appearances in the Football League between 1995 and 2008. He also holds the record for the most league clubs played for, which is 16. He most notably spent time in the Premier League with Leicester City, who he joined in 2000 from Cambridge United. He was capped by England U21 but went on to feature for Jamaica as a full international, where he earned two caps. Benjamin has also played as a professional in the Football League for Crystal Palace, Norwich City, West Bromwich Albion, Gillingham, Rushden & Diamonds, Brighton & Hove Albion, Northampton Town, Coventry City, Peterborough United, Watford, Swindon Town, Boston United, Walsall and Hereford United.

At the age of 28, Benjamin dropped out of the professional game and firstly signed for Conference North side Gainsborough Trinity. He went on to play for Northwich Victoria, Hednesford Town, Wellingborough Town, Kidsgrove Athletic, Tamworth, Harrogate Town and Woking. In 2010, he briefly joined Australian semi-pro side Sunshine George Cross, but failed to make an appearance and returned to the English Non-league game where he went on to feature for Bedlington Terriers, Wroxham and Morpeth Town. Having initially been on loan at Morpeth from Bedlington, he was later appointed player-manager of the club in November 2010 and managed the club until the end of the 2010–11 season.

Playing career

Cambridge United
Benjamin grew up in Wellingborough, Northamptonshire, supporting Arsenal with Ian Wright as his idol. His first club was Wellingborough Colts where he excelled as a striker, gaining representative honours with Northamptonshire. His potential was recognised and he played a friendly for Kettering Town, with his brother Richard. Trevor played in their youth team then started scoring regularly for the reserves.

He then signed as a trainee for Cambridge United where he made his professional début as a 16-year-old, against Gillingham in a 0–0 draw, during his time there he scored 46 goals in 146 appearances. He also scored both goals (one in the first leg and one in the second leg) as Third Division Cambridge knocked Premier League Sheffield Wednesday out of the League Cup 2–1 on aggregate in September 1998. He also scored as Cambridge knocked second tier Crystal Palace out of the FA Cup in December 1999.

Leicester City

Following some impressive displays for Cambridge United, Benjamin signed for Leicester City (where his work rate and goal celebrations saw him become something of a cult figure). He was signed for a fee of £1.3 million by manager Peter Taylor, who snapped up Benjamin as a replacement for the departed Emile Heskey who had joined Liverpool.

He made his debut for Leicester City, as a substitute, in a 0–0 draw with Sunderland, on 1 October 2000. He scored his first goal for the club in a 3–0 win at Middlesbrough on 18 November 2000, however this proved to be his only goal that season. Benjamin holds the record of most appearances made from the bench by any Leicester City player.

Benjamin then went on loan to three clubs in the 2001–02 season. His first loan spell was at Crystal Palace, where he scored once against Bradford City in six league appearances. He then joined Norwich City making six appearances again before joining West Bromwich Albion, where he scored on his debut against Barnsley and helped them get promoted to the Premier League. Benjamin spent the whole of the 2002–03 season back at Leicester. His next loan spell was at Gillingham in September 2003, where he scored on his debut against West Ham United. In November 2003 he was loaned out to Rushden & Diamonds, scoring once against Port Vale. His next loan was at Brighton & Hove Albion in January 2004. At Brighton he scored five goals in ten league appearances and manager Mark McGhee was keen to extend his loan to the end of the season. However he returned to his parent club in March 2004 and Brighton were promoted in his absence. In January 2005 new Leicester City manager Craig Levein made the decision to cancel Benjamin's contract.

Northampton Town and Coventry City
Benjamin joined Northampton Town permanently on 19 January 2005, after a few weeks on loan to the club. Trevor was later signed up by Coventry manager Micky Adams (under whom he had played at Leicester) until the end of the season, scoring once against Watford.

Peterborough United and Hereford United
In the summer of 2005 Benjamin was released again and later signed for Peterborough United on a three-year deal, stating his main motivation was to gain first team football. Benjamin later made loan appearances for Watford, Swindon Town, Boston United and Walsall. Benjamin went on to sign for Hereford United on 1 August 2007. He made his début for the club in a 0–0 draw against Rotherham United on 11 August 2007. His first goal followed a week later, from the penalty spot, in a 2–1 win away at Barnet. He continued his impressive form in the first half of the season and became something of a fans favourite at Edgar Street, scoring his share of goals. However he did not start another match for the Bulls after the defeat to Cardiff at the end of January, which coincided with the arrival of Gary Hooper on loan.

Non-league
On 19 May 2008, Benjamin was released from Hereford United, being told his services will not be needed in the following season, despite being the club's third top goalscorer that season. He joined Conference North club Gainsborough Trinity on non-contract terms in August 2008, a week later after joining Gainsborough Trinity, the Lincolnshire Echo revealed the player had also been training with Cheltenham Town. Despite this Trevor was released by a 'disappointed' Steve Charles after just three appearances for Gainsborough Trinity, with the Blues noting that the Jamaican International had under performed in his games.

Benjamin had trials with Cheltenham Town, Gillingham and AFC Bournemouth at the start of the 2008–09 season, but failed to earn a contract at any of the three clubs. Bournemouth manager Jimmy Quinn said of the player, "He's not what I'm looking for, he's probably past his sell-by date." On 10 October 2008, Benjamin signed for Northwich Victoria, but was released three weeks later as part of cost-cutting measures. He then made one appearance at Hednesford Town in the Northern Premier League Premier Division, after a few games for the club he was released. A couple of weeks later, Benjamin moved further down the non-league ladder to sign for his home town club Wellingborough Town in the United Counties Football League. He scored on his debut in the 2–2 Boxing Day draw with Raunds Town.
Recent speculations have linked him, like in the summer of 2008, to Chester City.

However, Benjamin moved on to Kidsgrove Athletic in the Northern Premier League Division One South, making his debut in a 5–2 win against Brigg Town on 14 February 2009.
He made 12 league appearances during the 2008–09 season, and another two appearances in the Staffordshire Senior Cup, helping them win the final on 22 April 2009. But Benjamin has recently stated that he would like a return to league football after fully recovering from his eye infection. He is currently on trial with Rushden & Diamonds in a bid to earn a contract for the new season. On 7 August 2009, Trevor Benjamin signed for Conference National newcomers Tamworth, following a successful trial period with the club.

He made his debut the following day in a Conference National away fixture against Stevenage Borough, Benjamin came on as a 79th-minute substitute for midfielder Tom Shaw. The game finished in a 1–1 draw. He moved on to Harrogate Town in the Conference North, making his debut and scoring two goals in a 3–2 loss against Northwich Victoria on 3 October 2009.
In his second appearance, against Droylsden, he scored again with a stunning free-kick in the last few minutes of the game. He departed in November after his rolling month-to-month contract was not renewed.

He made his debut for Woking in a 6–0 win against St Albans City in the FA Trophy competition, on 21 November 2009.
After another two games for the Cards, he was released prior to 5 December 2009 match against Bishop's Stortford. He joined Bedlington Terriers in Northern League Division One on a free transfer in February 2010. The next month he joined Wroxham in Eastern Counties League Premier Division for a short loan spell.

In September 2010 he was loaned out again, to Terrier's local rivals Morpeth Town. After two goalless appearances, the 3–0 home defeat by Marske United and the 2–1 away defeat by Newton Aycliffe, he was appointed the club's player-manager following the departure of previous manager Tom Wade. Shortly after his release he signed for Seaton Delaval Amateurs.

International career
Benjamin was selected for the England under-21s, making his only appearance as a substitute against Mexico at Filbert Street on 24 May 2001.

He made his international début for Jamaica on 20 November 2002 against Nigeria, in Lagos.

Personal life
After retiring from competitive football Benjamin has launched his own brand of goalkeeping gloves called Locust UK.

Career statistics

References

External links

 Trevor Benjamin's Profile on LCFC.com
 Trevor Benjamin's Profile at Premierleague.com
 
 Info on Trevor at Sporting-heroes.net
 Profile at UpThePosh! The Peterborough United Database
 Career information at ex-canaries.co.uk

1979 births
Cambridge United F.C. players
Leicester City F.C. players
Crystal Palace F.C. players
Norwich City F.C. players
West Bromwich Albion F.C. players
Gillingham F.C. players
Rushden & Diamonds F.C. players
Brighton & Hove Albion F.C. players
Northampton Town F.C. players
Coventry City F.C. players
Peterborough United F.C. players
Watford F.C. players
Swindon Town F.C. players
Boston United F.C. players
Walsall F.C. players
Hereford United F.C. players
Gainsborough Trinity F.C. players
Northwich Victoria F.C. players
Hednesford Town F.C. players
Wellingborough Town F.C. players
Kidsgrove Athletic F.C. players
Tamworth F.C. players
Harrogate Town A.F.C. players
Woking F.C. players
Caroline Springs George Cross FC players
Bedlington Terriers F.C. players
Wroxham F.C. players
Morpeth Town A.F.C. players
Seaton Delaval F.C. players
National League (English football) players
England under-21 international footballers
English footballers
English people of Jamaican descent
Association football forwards
Jamaica international footballers
Jamaican expatriate footballers
Jamaican footballers
Living people
Sportspeople from Kettering
People from Wellingborough
Premier League players
English Football League players
English football managers
Morpeth Town A.F.C. managers